Oslip is a town in Burgenland, Austria, known for its viticulture.  It lies in the Eisenstadt-Umgebung district in the state of Burgenland.

Oslip is located about 60 km south of Vienna.

History

Oslip was known as Oszlop, Sopron, Hungary prior to the breakup of the Austro-Hungarian Empire in 1918.

Population

References

External links
www.Oslip.at — Official website (in German)
www.Burgenland.info — Burgenland info
Nona.net — region maps of Oslip
www.WineDirectories.com — Wineries in Oslip
www.WebTourist.net — Tourism information

Cities and towns in Eisenstadt-Umgebung District
Wine regions of Austria